Noord-Nederlands Trein & Tram Museum is a railway museum in Zuidbroek, Netherlands. It is situated in the 19th-century building of the Zuidbroek railway station.

In 2011, the Province of Groningen provided a subsidy of 100,000 euro for the restoration of the station building and the exploitation of the museum. The museum was opened on 10 October 2014 by State Secretary for Infrastructure and the Environment, Wilma Mansveld. It had 1,517 visitors in 2014 and 3,868 visitors in 2015.

The museum is a member of the Museumhuis Groningen (Museum House Groningen), an umbrella organization for museums and heritage institutions in the province of Groningen.

References

External links 
  , official website

2014 establishments in the Netherlands
Museums established in 2014
Museums in Groningen (province)
Rail transport in Groningen (province)
Railway museums in the Netherlands
Transport in Midden-Groningen
21st-century architecture in the Netherlands